Challwamayu may refer to:

 Challwamayu (Huancavelica), a river in Peru
 Challwamayu (Junín), a river in Peru